Beaten by Them is a multi-national San Francisco/Melbourne/New York quintet combining cello, guitars, bass, drums and electronics.

Musical style
Beaten by Them's music is generally categorized as post-rock, but has been noted for being difficult to narrow to one specific genre. The band incorporates elements of rock, jazz, ambient, drone and electronic styles and draws comparisons to classical music through its prominent use of cello and compositional style. The cinematic scope of the music has also been likened to film directors such as Werner Herzog and David Lynch.

History
The band was started by Harris and McCormick in early 2005. McCormick was interested in applying the ideas he'd had producing electronic music, particularly with regards to structure, to the guitar based music that Harris was coming up with. McCormick had also been profoundly influenced by his experiences making fully improvised music with San Francisco band Whirr. They enlisted bassist Matheson (whose former band had once opened for Kiss) and began experimentation in an artist basement subspace in the Lower Haight. Their neighbor in the subspace, Swedish-native Bjorkbom, had recently given up experimenting hooking up machines to make trance music, and decided to go full tilt back into playing jazz drums. McCormick managed to convince him that he could approach this band's music like jazz. Tucker joined the band after overhearing a phone conversation on the street between McCormick and Harris about needing to find a cellist. That first year they recorded their first demo, resulting in one track which later got released: Steam. Their first public performance was at the Connecticut Yankee in San Francisco in November 2005.

Both Australians, Harris and McCormick moved to Melbourne at the end of 2005, but decided to try to keep the band going regardless of geography. They returned to the US in May 2006 to tour on the West Coast, as well as record their first album, Signs of Life, at Tiny Telephone, San Francisco over 3 days. Post-production was carried out by Harris and McCormick themselves upon return to their Logicpole studio in Melbourne. The album was released in December 2007 via Logicpole.  The original lineup came apart after when Bjorkbom and Matheson had issues preventing them traveling to Europe where the band was booked to play.

McCormick asked his longtime friend Murray to play bass who enlisted drummer Ardziejewski (pronounced "RJFski") to join the band. The band toured the US in August 2008 with this new lineup and then recorded their second album, Invisible Origins, in Portland, Oregon at Klickitat Studios during April 2009. In addition to their usual instrumentation, they incorporated acoustic instruments like piano, vibraphone and trumpet, as well as considerable computer generated/processed sound. Although the mixing was completed by the end of 2009, it took them all of 2010 to select material and complete Invisible Origins. The album was released in February 2011. In November 2011 the People Start Listening EP was released, which saw the band move deeper into ambient and electronic territory.

Beaten by Them's fourth album Kinder Machines, which was recorded and mixed by Oz Fritz, was released in October 2012.

Harris and McCormick currently reside in Melbourne, Murray and Ardziejewski in San Francisco and Tucker in New York City.

Members

Present
 Andrew Harris - guitar
 Max McCormick - guitar/keys
 Boima Tucker - cello
 Spencer Murray - bass
 Jeff Ardziejewski - drums

Past
 Lee Matheson - bass
 Ulf (Chris) Bjorkbom - drums

Discography

Studio albums
 Steam (2005)
 Signs of Life (2007)
 Invisible Origins (2011)
 People Start Listening (2011)
 Kinder Machines (2012)

Notes and references

External links
Official band website
Beaten by Them at Allmusic

American post-rock groups
Musical groups from San Francisco